Manchester Sport and Leisure Trust is a non-profit organisation which manages sport and leisure venues in the City of Manchester, United Kingdom. MSLT was founded in 1997 and is a company limited by guarantee with charitable status with a turnover of £12.5m. MSLT is based at the Sportcity site.

Operations
MSLT manages:
 Abraham Moss Leisure Centre
 Arcadia Leisure Centre, Levenshulme
 Ardwick Sports Hall
 Belle Vue Leisure Centre
 Broadway Leisure Centre, Moston
 Chorlton Leisure Centre
 Levenshulme Swimming Pools
 Manchester Aquatics Centre
 Manchester National Squash
 Manchester Regional Arena
 Manchester Regional Gymnastic
 Manchester Regional Hockey
 Manchester Tennis & Football
 Miles Platting Swimming Pools
 Moss Side Leisure Centre
 National Cycling Centre
 North City Centre, Harpurhey
 Sportcity
 Ten Acres Leisure Centre, Newton Heath
 Withington Leisure Centre

References

Sport in Manchester